Zaharira Harifai (December 12, 1929 – January 2, 2013) was an Israeli film, stage, and television actress and recipient of the Israel Prize in Theater, which she was awarded in 2003. The Jerusalem Post called her "one of Israel's most celebrated actresses."

She was born and raised in Tel Aviv. Her father, Haim Leib Harifai, immigrated from Russia in 1922. He became a journalist, but died of pneumonia when Harifai was four years old. Harifai graduated from Mikveh Yisrael agricultural school in 1946 and then became a member of the first brigade of the Palmach battalion. She studied acting and theater at the "Hadramati" school, the drama school of the Cameri Theater. She joined the ensemble of the Cameri Theater in 1968 and remained at the theater until her death in 2013.

In 2003, Harifai was awarded the Israel Prize for Theater. She won the Best Actress in Theater award in 2011 for her role in the Anat Gov play, Happy End.

Death
Zaharira Harifai died from cancer at the age of 83 in Tel Aviv. A memorial was held at the Cameri Theater. She was buried at the Kibbutz Givat HaShlosha cemetery. Harifai was survived by her husband, writer Shlomo Shva, daughter Aya Shva, a director and actress, and two grandchildren.

References

External links

1929 births
2013 deaths
Israel Prize in theatre recipients
Israel Prize women recipients
Israeli film actresses
Israeli people of Russian-Jewish descent
Israeli stage actresses
Israeli television actresses
Palmach members
People from Jaffa
Actresses from Tel Aviv
Women in war in the Middle East
Women in warfare post-1945
Deaths from cancer in Israel
Jewish Israeli actresses